Romario Tyrese Martin (born 30 August 1999) is a Kittian and Nevisian professional footballer who currently plays for  side Redditch United, where he plays as a forward.

Club career
Born in Basseterre, Saint Kitts and Nevis, Martin grew up in Birmingham, West Midlands and started his career in the youth team at Walsall. He later joined Midland Football League side Continental Star before he signed for the Academy at Solihull Moors in the summer of 2016. In October 2016, he joined Northern Premier League Premier Division side Barwell on loan. Whilst still part of the Solihull Moors Academy he spent two weeks on trial at EFL League Two side Grimsby Town in early 2017. On 17 March 2017 he joined Midland Football League side Highgate United on loan until the end of the season.

On 28 October 2017 he made his first team debut for Solihull in the National League replacing Akwasi Asante as a late substitute in the 4–0 defeat to AFC Fylde. He made a further three appearances for the first team before he signed for Northern Premier League Division One South side Romulus on loan.

Martin signed for Southern League Premier Central side Nuneaton Borough on 7 June 2019. Romario departed Nuneaton Borough on 29 August 2019, joining Southern League Division One Central side Coleshill Town.

On 14 September 2019, Martin left Coleshill Town and returned to the Southern League Premier Central, signed for Redditch United, who had spent some time on trial with earlier in the season. Martin scored his first and second goals for Redditch United in a 3-2 victory over Nuneaton Borough on 22 February 2020, following on from a 30 game losing streak.

International career
Martin received his first call-up to Saint Kitts and Nevis in February 2017 to the under-20 side for qualification matches for the 2017 FIFA U-20 World Cup. He made three appearances as the side were eliminated in the group stages scoring once in the 4–1 defeat to the United States.

Career statistics

Club

International

References

External links

1999 births
Living people
People from Basseterre
Saint Kitts and Nevis international footballers
Association football midfielders
Continental Star F.C. players
Solihull Moors F.C. players
Barwell F.C. players
Highgate United F.C. players
Romulus F.C. players
Nuneaton Borough F.C. players
Coleshill Town F.C. players
Redditch United F.C. players
National League (English football) players
Northern Premier League players
Saint Kitts and Nevis footballers
Saint Kitts and Nevis youth international footballers